Jawaharlal Nehru Cancer Hospital & Research Centre is a government aided societycancer care hospital in Bhopal, India. It was founded in 1995 by Madhya Pradesh Cancer Chikitsa Evam Seva Samiti (meaning: Madhya Pradesh Cancer Treatment and Service Society).

References 

Hospital buildings completed in 1995
Hospitals in Madhya Pradesh
Buildings and structures in Bhopal
Monuments and memorials to Jawaharlal Nehru
Science and technology in Bhopal
1995 establishments in Madhya Pradesh
20th-century architecture in India